The North Andover Center Historic District encompasses the historic center of North Andover, Massachusetts, which was also the heart of neighboring Andover until the two towns split in 1855.  The district is roughly bounded by Osgood, Pleasant, Stevens, Johnson, and Andover Streets and Wood Lane.  It includes 75 properties, including the Parson Barnard House, and the Kittredge Mansion, the latter of which is built on land that included the town's original muster ground.

The district was listed on the National Register of Historic Places in 1979.

See also
National Register of Historic Places listings in Essex County, Massachusetts
List of the oldest buildings in Massachusetts

References

External links
 North Andover Historical Society

Historic districts in Essex County, Massachusetts
North Andover, Massachusetts
National Register of Historic Places in Essex County, Massachusetts
Historic districts on the National Register of Historic Places in Massachusetts